N. K. Akbar  is an Indian politician serving as the MLA of  Guruvayur Constituency since May 2021.
He represents Guruvayur  (State Assembly constituency) in 16th Kerala State Legislative Assembly.[1][2] He is a post graduate in MA from Kannur University.[3]

References 

Kerala MLAs 2021–2026
Communist Party of India (Marxist) politicians from Kerala
Year of birth missing (living people)
Living people